The 2012 Puerto Rico government transition process is the ongoing process in Puerto Rico regarding the government transition between the outgoing governorship of incumbent Governor Luis Fortuño and the incoming governorship of Alejandro García Padilla, governor-elect. The process is mandated and regulated by Law No. 197 of 2002 and started on November 13, 2012, three working days after the Puerto Rican general election of 2012 as the law requires, once García Padilla was preliminarily certified as Governor-elect by the State Elections Commission.

As expected, the process has unveiled discrepancies between what the incumbent administration portrayed in the media and what the current status of the government of Puerto Rico truly is; in particular its Consolidated Fund, budget balance, labor statistics, and performance and metrics.

Outgoing Committee
The 2012 Puerto Rico Outgoing Committee on Government Transition is the committee in charge of the transition process on behalf of the incumbent administration of Governor Luis Fortuño. The Committee is composed of government officers from Fortuño's administration, including, as required by law:

 style="margin: 0 auto"
|-
! scope=col style="text-align: left" | Name
! scope=col style="text-align: left" | Position
! scope=col style="text-align: left" | Organization
|-
| Guillermo Somoza
| Secretary of Justice
| Department of Justice
|-
| Jesús F. Méndez
| Secretary of Treasury
| Department of Treasury
|-
| Juan C. Batlle
| President
| Government Development Bank
|-
| Juan Carlos Pavía
| Director
| Office of Management and Budget
|-
| Kenneth McClintock
| Secretary of State
| Department of State
|-
| Miguel Romero
| Chief of Staff
| Secretariat of Governance
|-
| Rubén A. Hernández Gregorat
| Secretary of Transportation and Public Works
| Department of Transportation and Public Works
|-
| Rubén Flores Marzán
| President
| Planning Board
|-

McClintock serves as the Outgoing Committee's president while Romero serves as its executive director.

Incoming Committee
The 2012 Puerto Rico Incoming Committee on Government Transition is the committee in charge of the transition process on behalf of Alejandro García Padilla, Governor-elect. The Committee is composed of aides and assistants of García Padilla, as follows:

 style="margin: 0 auto"
|-
! scope=col style="text-align: left" | Name
! scope=col style="text-align: left" | Position
! scope=col style="text-align: left" | Remarks
|-
| Alberto Bacó Bagué
| Member
| former Director of the Economic Development Bank and former Executive Vice President of the Government Development Bank
|-
| Celeste Freytes
| Member
| former Vice President of Academic Affairs of the University of Puerto Rico
|-
| David H. Chafey Jr.
| Member
| former President of Banco Popular
|-
| Dolores Rodríguez de Oronoz
| President & Executive Director
| former Appeals Justice and advisor on Rafael Hernández Colón's Office of the Governor
|-
| Ingrid Vila Biaggi
| Vice President
| former sub-Secretary of Government for Sila Maria Calderón
|-
| Jorge Sánchez
| Member
| former rector of the University of Puerto Rico, Medical Sciences Campus
|-
| José A. Andréu Fuentes
| Member
| former legal officer for Chief Justice Víctor Pons
|-
| Juan Acosta Reboyras
| Member
| former member of the Board of First Bank Puerto Rico
|-
| Juan B. Aponte
| Member
| Emeritus Professor of the University of Puerto Rico
|-
| Palmira N. Ríos González
| Member
| former President of the Commission on Civil Rights
|-
| Roberto Pagán Rodríguez
| Member
| President of the Puerto Rican Workers Union
|-
| Salvador Antonetti Zequeira
| Member
| former Secretary of the Board of Trustees of the University of Puerto Rico
|-

Rodríguez de Oronoz serves as both the Incoming Committee's President and Executive Director while Vila Biaggi serves as its Vice President.

Controversial issues

In November 16, 2012, the Outgoing Committee admitted in public hearing that the Puerto Rico General Fund was not in fact as robust as previously informed by the incumbent administration. One hearing after,  effectively making the deficit almost three times higher than previously reported and unveiling a cash flow insolvency on the Department of Treasury.

References

External links
 www.leydetransicion2012.pr.gov – official site of the 2012 Outgoing Committee 
 www.transicionpuertorico.com – official site of the 2012 Incoming Committee 

Puerto Rico government transition processes by session